Margaret Richards is a former Canadian international lawn bowler.

Bowls career
Richards has represented Canada at the Commonwealth Games, in the fours at the 1994 Commonwealth Games.

She won the fours gold medal at the 1993 Asia Pacific Bowls Championships, in Victoria, Canada, with Anita Nivala, Jean Roney and Margaret Fettes. She has won three Canadian National titles.

References

Canadian female bowls players
Living people
Bowls players at the 1994 Commonwealth Games
Year of birth missing (living people)
20th-century Canadian women